Francis Stewart Leland Lyons  (11 November 1923 – 21 September 1983) was an Irish historian and academic who was Provost of Trinity College Dublin from 1974 to 1981.

Biography
Known as Le among his friends and family, Lyons was born in Derry, Northern Ireland, in 1923, where his father was a bank official. He was born into an Irish Protestant family of Presbyterian and Church of Ireland background. After his birth, his family soon moved to Boyle, County Roscommon, Irish Free State. He was educated at Dover College in Kent and later attended The High School, Dublin. At Trinity College Dublin, he was elected a Scholar in Modern History and Political Science in 1943.

He was a lecturer in history at the University of Hull and then at Trinity College Dublin. He became the founding Professor of Modern History at the University of Kent in 1964, serving also as Master of Eliot College from 1969 to 1972.

Lyons became Provost of Trinity College Dublin in 1974, but relinquished the post in 1981 to concentrate on writing. He won the Heinemann Prize in 1978 for his work in Charles Stewart Parnell. He wrote Culture and Anarchy in Ireland, 1890–1939 which won the Christopher Ewart-Biggs Memorial Prize and the Wolfson Literary Prize for History in 1979. Lyons was also awarded honorary doctorates by five universities, and had fellowships at the Royal Society of Literature and the British Academy. He was Visiting Professor at Princeton University.

His principal works include Ireland Since the Famine, the standard university textbook for Irish history from the mid-19th to late-20th century, which The Times called "the definitive work of modern Irish history" and a biography of Charles Stewart Parnell.

Lyons was critical of Cecil Woodham-Smith's much-acclaimed history of the Great Irish Famine and has generally been considered among the "revisionist" historians whose political sympathies underplayed the negative role of the British state in events like the Famine.

Lyons married his wife Jennifer McAlister Lyons in 1964, and had two sons. Following a short illness, Lyons died in Dublin in 1983, just shy of his 60th birthday. Transnational history may be defined as the study of movements and forces that cut across national boundaries. Political

Bibliography

John Dillon: A Biography (1968)
Ireland Since the Famine (1971)
Charles Stewart Parnell (1977)
Culture and Anarchy in Ireland, 1890–1939 (1979) - won the Christopher Ewart-Biggs Memorial Prize

References

1923 births
1983 deaths
Academics of the University of Kent
Christopher Ewart-Biggs Memorial Prize recipients
Fellows of the British Academy
Fellows of the Royal Society of Literature
Historians from Northern Ireland
20th-century Irish historians
Irish writers
Male non-fiction writers from Northern Ireland
People educated at The High School, Dublin
People from County Londonderry
People from County Roscommon
Provosts of Trinity College Dublin
Revisionist historians (Ireland)
Scholars of Trinity College Dublin
Historians of the Land War
Irish expatriates in the United Kingdom